Persian mythology or Iranian mythology (Persian:اساطیرشناسی ایرانی) is the body of the myths originally told by ancient Persians and other Iranian peoples, and a genre of Ancient Persian folklore. These stories concern the origin and nature of the world, the lives and activities of deities, heroes, and mythological creatures, and the origins and significance of the ancient Persians' own cult and ritual practices. Modern scholars study the myths to shed light on the religious and political institutions of not only modern-day Iran but the Greater Iran, which includes regions of West Asia, Central Asia, South Asia and Transcaucasia where Iranian culture has had significant influence. Historically, these were regions long ruled by dynasties of various Iranian empires, that incorporated considerable aspects of Persian culture through extensive contact with them, or where sufficient Iranian peoples settled to still maintain communities who patronize their respective cultures. It roughly corresponds to the Iranian plateau and its bordering plains. The Encyclopædia Iranica uses the term Iranian Cultural Continent for this region.

Religious background

Most characters in Persian mythology are either good, or they are evil. The resultant discord mirrors the nationalistic ideals of the early Islamic era as well as the moral and ethical perceptions of the Zoroastrian period, in which the world was perceived to be locked in a battle between the destructive Ahriman and his hordes of demonic Divs and their Aneran supporters, versus the Creator Ormuzd, who although not participating in the day-to-day affairs of mankind, was represented in the world by the izads and the righteous ahlav Iranians.

Good and Evil

On the other side of the fence is Zahhak, a symbol of despotism who was, finally, defeated by Kāve, who led a popular uprising against him. Zahhak was guarded by two vipers which grew out from both of his shoulders. No matter how many times they were beheaded, new heads grew on them to guard him. The snake, like in many other mythologies, was a symbol of evil, but many other animals and birds appear in Iranian mythology, and, especially, the birds were signs of good omens. Most famous of these is the Simurgh, a large, beautiful, and powerful bird; and the Huma bird, a royal bird of victory whose plume adorned Persian crowns.

Peri (Avestan Pairika), a beautiful albeit evil woman in early mythology, gradually became less evil and more beautiful.

The conflict between good and evil is prevalent in Persian myths as well as Zoroastrianism.

See also 
Armenian mythology
Iranian mythology
List of articles related to Persian mythology
Persian folklore
Persian literature
Proto-Indo-Iranian religion
Zoroastrianism

Notes

References

 Iran almanac and book of facts 1964–1965. Fourth edition, new print. Published by Echo of Iran, Tehran 1965.

Further reading

External links 

 Iranian Mythology by Albert J. Carnoy
 Indo-Iranian Mythology
 Iran Almanac 2006

 
Iranian mythology
Persian culture